Galoon is a village in  Gram Panchayat Kadiwan of Rohru tehsil of Shimla district in the Indian state of Himachal Pradesh. It is approximately 48 km from Rohru and 102 km from district headquarters Shimla.

References

 https://schools.org.in/shimla/02112002602/gps-galoon.html

Villages in Shimla district